Anna Basta (born 23 January 2001) is an Italian group rhythmic gymnast. A member of the national squad since 2017. She is the 2018 World Group All-around silver medalist and two-time European (2018) Group All-around silver medalist.

References

External links 
 

2001 births
Living people
Italian rhythmic gymnasts
Sportspeople from Bologna
European Games competitors for Italy
Gymnasts at the 2019 European Games
Medalists at the Rhythmic Gymnastics European Championships
Medalists at the Rhythmic Gymnastics World Championships
21st-century Italian women